Deceiver is an album by Muslimgauze released in a numbered limited edition of 800 copies as part of Staalplaat's subscription-only series of Muslimgauze releases.

Track listing
All tracks by Bryn Jones

CD 1
"Deceiver" - 24:40
"Palestine Is Our Islamic Land" - 6:05
"Azeri Jab" - 4:48
"A Parsee View" - 3:24
"Zenana Acidbox" - 4:03
"Herod-1" - 3:26
"Sanskrit" - 4:02
"Morsel Of Sand" - 3:16
"Yemani" - 1:41
"Khshatrapa" - 3:06
"Feztoun" - 1:44
"A Parsee View" - 2:22
"Deceiver" - 3:56
"Herod-2" - 2:41
"Palestine Is Our Islamic Land" - 4:14

CD 2
"Zameenzad" - 5:19
"Balfour Blood" - 4:51
"Unorthodox Singh Babel" - 2:28
"Jagdish Masjid Of Light" - 3:21
"Naguib Amber Reptile" - 2:38
"Saudi" - 4:04
"Guru Of Falsehood" - 2:52
"Aquarabiq" - 2:01
"Chandraswami" - 3:00
"Sikandra An Fail" - 4:08
"Mahfouz Ala" - 3:08
"Rajputta" - 3:06
"Akbars Final Fax" - 2:38
"Jagdish Masjid Of Night" - 3:22
"Hinducash" - 1:03
"Aquarabik" - 2:04
"Free From A Veil" - 4:57
"Red Swami" - 0:38
"Red Swami (p12/p13)" - 6:12

External links
Deceiver on muslimgauze.org

Muslimgauze albums
1996 albums